Sqrl may refer to:

 SQRL (pronounced 'squirrel'), an open standard for secure website login and authentication
 sqrl (born Kraig Tyler), member of U.S. rap rock band Crazy Town
 "SQRL", a 2010 song by Kids of 88 on their album Sugarpills

See also

 Sqrrl
 Squirrel (disambiguation)
 Square One (disambiguation) (Sqr.1)
 SQR version 1 (SQR-1)